Neal Mohan (born 1973 or 1974) is an Indian-American business executive, who is the fourth and current CEO of YouTube. He succeeded Susan Wojcicki on February 16, 2023.

Early life 
Neal Mohan was born in either 1973 or 1974 to a Tamil Hindu family. He grew up in the U.S state of Michigan, as well as in Florida, before briefly spending a few more years in India during high school at St. Francis' College. At some point between then and the 1990s, Mohan moved back to the United States and by the time he was involved with YouTube, he was an American citizen. He attended Stanford University, graduating in 1996 with a degree in electrical engineering.

Career

Accenture and Net Gravity 
After graduation, Mohan worked at Accenture, then owned by Arthur Andersen. In 1997, he joined a startup called Net Gravity, becoming a key figure in the company's operations and greatly expanding its prominence.

DoubleClick 
In 1997, Net Gravity was acquired by DoubleClick. Mohan moved from California to the company's headquarters in New York. In the next several years, he gradually became more involved in central business affairs within the company, with DoubleClick relying on him for cutting costs in the wake of the burst of the dot-com bubble . He became the vice president of business operations.

In 2003, he returned to Stanford to pursue his MBA. While he was at Stanford, DoubleClick began to face serious issues stemming from its acquisition of Abacus Direct in 1999. The merger was de facto annulled by Hellman & Friedman, who acquired DoubleClick and split off Abacus Direct from it. Hellman & Friedman requested that longtime executive David Rosenblatt become CEO of DoubleClick in the wake of the company's partition. Rosenblatt accepted this offer and also enlisted Mohan after he acquired his MBA in 2005, under Mohan's conditions that he would stay in California.

Together, Rosenblatt and Mohan devised a plan to orient DoubleClick towards being a company vested upon advertising exchange, core ad technology situations, and an extensive ad network. This plan was outlined in a 400-slide PowerPoint presentation, said by those who created or have seen it to still have influence on current business plans by Google. The plan was presented to the board of DoubleClick and Hellman & Friedman in December 2005, who approved it.

Google 

On April 13, 2007, Google agreed to acquire DoubleClick for US$3.1 billion. Google executive Susan Wojcicki largely orchestrated this action. For the next 15 years, she worked extensively with Mohan, who formally joined Google in 2007, playing a key role in the integration process with DoubleClick While at Google, Mohan managed the company's 2010 US$85 million acquisition of Invite Media. Before moving to YouTube, he was senior vice president of display and video ads at Google.

In 2011, Rosenblatt, who was now a board member of Twitter, attempted to hire Mohan as chief product officer. Though Mohan nearly accepted, Google paid him US$ 100 million in order to remain at the company. A former Facebook senior executive also stated that he attempted to hire Mohan while he was at Google.

YouTube 

Mohan joined YouTube (a Google subsidiary) in 2015 as Chief Product Officer. During his time at the company, he managed a number of its marquees throughout the late 2010s and early 2020s, including YouTube Music, YouTube TV, YouTube Premium, YouTube Shorts, and YouTube NFTs. Following political efforts to overturn the 2020 United States presidential election, including the January 6 capitol riot, Mohan testified before Congress and attended a White House summit in September 2022 to announce stricter guidelines to combat extremism on the YouTube platform.

On February 16, 2023, Mohan was selected to succeed Susan Wojcicki as YouTube's CEO.

Other ventures 
Mohan has also worked with Microsoft and currently sits on the boards of Stitch Fix and 23andMe.

Personal life 
Mohan is married to Hema Sareen Mohan, who has worked in the non-profit and public welfare sectors for two decades. He married his wife while in New York during his time working for DoubleClick.

References

External links 
 Neal Mohan on Twitter

American people of Indian descent
Indian emigrants to the United States
Living people
American chief executives
1970s births
Place of birth missing (living people)
Stanford University alumni